Samik Mitra (born 1 December 2000) is an Indian professional footballer who plays as a goalkeeper for Chennaiyin in the Indian Super League.

Career
After graduating from AIFF Elite Academy Samik was signed by Chennaiyin B in October 2017. 
He was sent on loan to Indian Arrows in 2018-19 season. He made his professional debut for the Indian Arrows on 8 February 2019 against Chennai City FC at Kalinga Stadium. He started and played full match as Indian Arrows lost 0–2.

Career statistics

Club

References

2000 births
Living people
People from West Bengal
Indian footballers
Indian Arrows players
Footballers from West Bengal
I-League players
Association football goalkeepers
Chennaiyin FC B players
Chennaiyin FC players
Indian Super League players